Show Us Your Hits is a greatest hits compilation album released by the Bloodhound Gang on December 21, 2010. The double entendre in the title is typical of the band's style.

In addition to album tracks, Show Us Your Hits features "Altogether Ooky", and some versions also feature "Screwing You on the Beach at Night" and "Disco Pogo", a song by German duo Die Atzen featuring Jimmy Pop.

Different versions of the album were released in different markets and formats. The US CD version features 12 tracks, the US digital and the European CD version features 14 tracks, the German version features 15 tracks and the European vinyl version features 16 tracks.

In March 2021, the album was released on vinyl, including "My Dad Says That's for Pussies" from Hard-Off and the German bonus track "Disco Pogo".

Track listing

The name of the model on the cover is Lia May.

Charts

References

2010 greatest hits albums
Bloodhound Gang albums
Geffen Records compilation albums